The Gate of Blending Harmony, or the Gate of Xiehe, Xiehemen, is a gate sits on the central road of the outer court of the Forbidden City, outside of the Gate of Supreme Harmony. On the eastern and opposite of the road to the Gate of Glorious Harmony. It was first built in the 18th year of Yongle and named the Gate of Left Obedience. The current one is re-built in the early years of Shunzhi and named so.

References

External links
 

Forbidden City
Buildings and structures in Beijing